A Tale of Two Cities is a British television series which first aired on BBC 1 in 1980. It is an adaptation of the novel A Tale of Two Cities by Charles Dickens. It is the only BBC adaptation known to exist entirely. The 1957 adaptation is completely lost, while the 1965 version has only two surviving episodes, both of which are unavailable to be seen publicly.

Plot summary

Cast
 Paul Shelley as Sydney Carton/Charles Darnay 
 Ralph Michael as Doctor Manette
 Sally Osborne as  Lucie Manette
 Vivien Merchant as  Miss Pross
 Nigel Stock as Jarvis Lorry
 Judy Parfitt as  Madame Defarge
 Stephen Yardley as  Defarge
 Eric Mason as  Jacques Three
 David Collings as  John Barsad
 Peter Cleall as  Jerry Cruncher
 Michael Halsey as Jacques One
 Brian Grellis as  Jacques Two
 David Webb as  Gabelle
 Harold Innocent as  Stryver
 John Abineri as  Roadmender 
 Morris Perry as  Marquis St. Evremonde
 Michael Gothard as  Gaspard
 Frank Tregear as  Roger Cly
 John Rolfe as Bank Clerk
 Harry Fielder as  Gaoler
 David Rose as  Guard Room Officer
 Dennis Savage as Young Cruncher
 Peter Farmer as Barrier Official2
 John Ringham as  Attorney-General

References

Bibliography
 Ellen Baskin. Serials on British Television, 1950-1994. Scolar Press, 1996.

External links
 

BBC television dramas
1980 British television series debuts
1980 British television series endings
1980s British drama television series
1980s British television miniseries
English-language television shows
Television series set in the 18th century
Television shows based on works by Charles Dickens
Works based on A Tale of Two Cities